Afshin Rattansi (born 1968) is a British broadcaster, journalist and author who presents Going Underground broadcast around the world except in the UK and EU, on television stations including the RT network, formerly known as Russia Today. He has also worked for the Today programme on BBC Radio 4, Channel 4, Al Jazeera, CNN International, Press TV and Bloomberg. He was the launch Business Editor of the Dubai Business Channel. He was also the first English-language producer at Qatar's Al Jazeera Television Network He writes occasional articles for CounterPunch and has contributed to scholarly journal, Critical Quarterly His work appeared in the Penguin Books anthology, Brought to Book and his quartet "The Dream of the Decade" came out in 2005.

Early life

Rattansi was born in Cambridge, England, in 1968, the son of immigrant parents, Prof. Pyarally Mohamedally Rattansi and Zarin Miraly Charania, who had married in London two years before. His father - late emeritus Professor of History and Philosophy of Science at University College London -was born in Kenya, one of the ten children of a tea planter, and the Rattansi family had originally come there from Chavand, a village in Kathiawar, India. He has a younger brother, Shihab.

Career
Rattansi began his career as a columnist for The Guardian before working on Britain's Channel 4 primetime documentary series executive produced by Tariq Ali and Darcus Howe, commissioned by Farukh Dhondy and Waldemar Januszczak.

Rattansi was a guest panelist in a 2018 edition of the BBC's Question Time in which the poisoning of Sergei and Yulia Skripal was discussed. Referring to Keir Starmer, Rattansi asked "Why is it that neo-con, neo-liberal Labour Party members continue to try and use WMDs to push us into war".

In 2022, Afshin Rattansi founded the production company Ghaf TV Productions in the United Arab Emirates where quarter of a century before he was the founding Business Editor of the Dubai Business Channel.

Filmography

Television

Documentaries

Books
 Afshin Rattansi, The Dream of the Decade: the London Novels (London: BookSurge, 2006)

References

External links 

 

1968 births
Living people
British people of Indian descent
Press TV people
RT (TV network) people